Robert Bees (born September 5, 1972) is a former American football quarterback who played two seasons in the Arena Football League (AFL) with the Oklahoma Wranglers, San Jose SaberCats and Buffalo Destroyers. He played college football at Rocky Mountain. He was also a member of the Richmond Speed, Billings Outlaws/Mavericks, Las Vegas Gladiators and Tulsa Talons.

Early years and college career
Bees attended Cajon High School in San Bernardino, California.

He redshirted a year for the Weber State Wildcats of Weber State University. He transferred and played a year for the San Bernardino Valley College Indians. He was part of two teams that went 20-1-1, and won the So. Cal. Bowl against El Camino and Potato Bowl against Bakersfield.

Bees played for the Ohio Bobcats of Ohio University in 1994. Bees made his first start for Ohio on October 22, 1994.

He played for the Rocky Mountain Battlin' Bears of Rocky Mountain College in 1996 after a year off from football. He helped Rocky Mountain open the season with a victory and the team finished 6-4. Bees recorded seven touchdown passes and a NAIA record 685 yards passing in a game against the Carroll Fighting Saints. He received first-team All-America recognition after throwing for 4,315 yards and 36 touchdowns in ten games.

Professional career

San Jose SaberCats
Bees was a member of the San Jose SaberCats of the AFL in 1999.

Oklahoma Wranglers
Bees was selected by the AFL's Oklahoma Wranglers in the 2000 Expansion Draft. He was released by the Wranglers on May 17, 2000.

Richmond Speed
Bees played for the Richmond Speed of the af2 from 2000 to 2002. He completed 262 of 502 pass attempts for 3,579 yards and 73 touchdowns while helping the Speed to ArenaCup II. He joined Richmond midway through the 2000 season and guided team to a 7-2 record after the Speed had gone 0-7. Bees started all 34 wins in Speed history and owned a 34-13 record as Richmond's starter.

Billings Outlaws
Bees was signed by the Billings Outlaws of the National Indoor Football League (NIFL) in December 2002.

San Jose SaberCats
Bees signed with the San Jose SaberCats on January 16, 2003. He was released by the SaberCats on April 16 and signed to the team's practice squad on April 18, 2003.

Buffalo Destroyers
Bees was signed by the Buffalo Destroyers off the San Jose SaberCats' practice squad on April 25, 2003. He started the Destroyers' final four games of the 2003 season.

Las Vegas Gladiators
Bees was traded to the Las Vegas Gladiators on November 19, 2003. He was released by the Gladiators on January 27, 2004.

Tulsa Talons
Bees played for the Tulsa Talons of the af2 in 2004. He made the National Conference All-af2 Second Team.  He played first game with the Talons on May 8 against the Bossier-Shreveport Battle Wings. Since then, the Talons recorded 12 wins, 11 consecutive, and one loss. He became a member of the 200/10,000 Club for af2 with 227 touchdown passes and 11,688 yards on August 4, 2004. As of August 6, 2004, Bees was ranked second in pass rating with a 118.7 rating.

Billings Mavericks
Bees was offensive coordinator and starting quarterback for the Billings Mavericks of the NIFL, helping them to the first round of the playoffs.

Coaching career
Bees continued as offensive coordinator of the Billings Outlaws in 2006, helping them to a NIFL Championship win. He was head coach of the San Diego Shockwave of the National Indoor Football League in 2007.

References

External links
Just Sports Stats
Ohio Bobcats stats

Living people
1972 births
American football quarterbacks
Weber State Wildcats football players
Ohio Bobcats football players
Rocky Mountain Battlin' Bears football players
Oklahoma Wranglers players
Richmond Speed players
San Jose SaberCats players
Buffalo Destroyers players
Tulsa Talons players
Billings Outlaws players
Las Vegas Gladiators players
Players of American football from California
Sportspeople from San Bernardino, California
San Bernardino Valley College alumni